Bo Ollander (25 July 1943 – 9 March 1973) was a Swedish speed skater. He competed in two events at the 1964 Winter Olympics.

References

External links
 

1943 births
1973 deaths
Swedish male speed skaters
Olympic speed skaters of Sweden
Speed skaters at the 1964 Winter Olympics
People from Strömsund Municipality
Sportspeople from Jämtland County
20th-century Swedish people